Johannes Peter Müller (14 July 1801 – 28 April 1858) was a German physiologist, comparative anatomist, ichthyologist, and herpetologist, known not only for his discoveries but also for his ability to synthesize knowledge. The paramesonephric duct (Müllerian duct) was named in his honor.

Life

Early years and education
Müller was born in Coblenz. He was the son of a poor shoemaker, and was about to be apprenticed to a saddler when his talents attracted the attention of his teacher, and he prepared himself to become a Roman Catholic Priest. During his college course in Koblenz, he devoted himself to the classics and made his own translations of Aristotle. At first, his intention was to become a priest.

When he was eighteen, his love for natural science became dominant, and he turned to medicine, entering the University of Bonn in 1819. There he received his M.D. in 1822. He then studied at the University of Berlin. There, under the influence of Georg Hegel and Karl Rudolphi, he was induced to reject all systems of physiology which were not founded upon a strict observation of nature. He habilited there in 1824.

Career summary
He became Privatdozent of physiology and comparative anatomy at the University of Bonn in 1824, extraordinary professor of physiology in 1826, and ordinary professor in 1830. In 1833 he went to the University of Berlin, where he filled the chair of anatomy and physiology until his death.

Early research
Müller made contributions in numerous domains of physiology, in particular increasing understanding of the voice, speech and hearing, as well as the chemical and physical properties of lymph, chyle and blood. His first important works, Zur vergleichenden Physiologie des Gesichtssinns (On the comparative physiology of sight, Leipzig, 1826) and Über die phantastischen Gesichtserscheinungen (On visual hallucination, Coblenz, 1826), are of a subjective philosophical tendency. The first work concerns the most important facts as to human and animal sight, the second sounds depths of difficult psychological problems. He soon became the leader in the science of the morphological treatment of zoology as well as of experimental physiology. To his research (1830) is due the settlement of the theory of reflex action.

Elements of Physiology
In the century preceding Müller's work, many contributions to physiological science had been made. Müller gave order to these facts, developed general principles and showed physiologists how recent discoveries in physics and chemistry could be applied to their work.

The appearance of his magnum opus, Handbuch der Physiologie des Menschen, between 1833 and 1840 (translated into English as Elements of Physiology by William Baly, and published in London 1837–1843) marked the beginning of a new period in the study of physiology. In it, for the first time, the results of human and comparative anatomy, as well as of chemistry and other departments of physical science, and tools like the microscope, were brought to bear on the investigation of physiological problems.

The most important portion of the work was that dealing with nervous action and the mechanism of the senses. Here he stated the principle, previously recognized but not stated as clearly, that the kind of sensation following stimulation of a sensory nerve does not depend on the mode of stimulation but upon the nature of the sense organ. Thus light, pressure, or mechanical stimulation acting on the retina and optic nerve invariably produces luminous impressions. This he termed the law of specific energies of the sense.

The book became the leading textbook in physiology for much of the nineteenth century. It manifests Müller's interests in vitalism, philosophy and scientific rigor. He discusses the difference between inorganic and organic matter. He considers in detail various physiological systems of a wide variety of animals, but attributes the indivisible whole of an organism to the presence of a soul. He also proposes that living organisms possess a life-energy for which physical laws can never fully account.

Edward Forbes F.R.S. in his  A History of British Starfishes, and Other Animals of the Class Echinodermata  (1841) in his preface refers to Muller as the "one of the greatest living physiologists, Muller of Berlin".

Later years
In the later part of his life he chiefly devoted himself to comparative anatomy. Fishes and marine invertebrates were his favorite subjects. He took 19 trips to the Baltic and North Sea, the Adriatic and the Mediterranean to investigate salt-water life.

He authored a comprehensive work on the anatomy of amphibians, which in his era including reptiles. Also, he described several new species of snakes.

Müller mentored such distinguished scientists and physiologists as Hermann von Helmholtz, Emil du Bois-Reymond, Fritz Müller, Theodor Schwann, Friedrich Gustav Jakob Henle, Ernst Wilhelm Brücke, Carl Ludwig and Ernst Haeckel. In 1834, he was elected a foreign member of the Royal Swedish Academy of Sciences. In 1846, the American Philosophical Society elected him an international Member. 

Müller died in Berlin in 1858. In 1899, a bronze statue by Joseph Uphues was erected in his memory in Koblenz.

Works
In addition to his Handbuch der Physiologie (translated by Baly in 1843: Elements of Physiology), his publications include:
De Respiratione Fœtus (Leipzig, 1823), a prize dissertation
Zur vergleichenden Physiologie des Gesichtssinns (1826)
Über die phantastischen Gesichtserscheinungen (1826)
Bildungsgeschichte der Genitalien (1830), in which he traced the development of the Müllerian duct
De glandularum secernentium structura penitiori (1830)
Beiträge zur Anatomie und Naturgeschichte der Amphibien (1832)
Der Tabak in geschichtlicher, botanischer, chemischer und medizinischer Hinsicht (Berlin, 1832)
Vergleichende Anatomie der Myxinoiden (1834–1843)
Ueber die organischen Nerven der erectilen männlichen Geschlechtsorgane . . . (Berlin, 1835)
Ueber den feineren Bau der krankhaften Geschwülste (On the structural details of malignant tumors, Coblenz, 1838), unfinished — a pioneering use of microscopical research in the investigation of pathological anatomy
Systematische Beschreibung der Plagiostomen (1841) with F. G. J. Henle
 (1842) with F. H. Troschel
Horae ichthyologicae (1845–1849) with Troschel
Über die fossilen Reste der Zeuglodonten . . . (1848)
Über Synopta digitata und über die Erzeugung von Schnecken in Holothurien (1852)
After the death of J. F. Meckel (1781–1833) he edited the Archiv für Anatomie und Physiologie.

See also
Connective tissue
Hering's law of equal innervation
List of German inventors and discoverers

Taxon described by him
See :Category:Taxa named by Johannes Peter Müller

Notes

References
Short biography and bibliography in the Virtual Laboratory of the Max Planck Institute for the History of Science
Berrios G E (2005) On the fantastic apparitions of vision by Johannes Müller. History of Psychiatry. 16:229-46. 

Attribution

Further reading
 Virchow, Johannes Müller, Eine Gedächtnisrede (Berlin, 1858)
 du Bois-Reymond,  (Abhandlungen der Berliner Akademie, Berlin, 1859), containing a list of his works
 Bischoff, Ueber Johannes Müller und sein Verhältnis zum jetztigen Standpunkt der Physiologie (Munich, 1858)
 Proceedings of the Royal Society of London, vol. ix., p. 556.

External links
 Müller's Handbuch der Physiologie des Menschen für Vorlesungen (1837–1840) as fullscan from the original
 
 

1801 births
1858 deaths
German physiologists
19th-century German zoologists
German herpetologists
German ichthyologists
German taxonomists
History of neuroscience
Recipients of the Copley Medal
Foreign Members of the Royal Society
Members of the Royal Swedish Academy of Sciences
Recipients of the Pour le Mérite (civil class)
Academic staff of the Humboldt University of Berlin
Academic staff of the University of Bonn
Humboldt University of Berlin alumni
University of Bonn alumni
Scientists from Koblenz
People from the Rhine Province
German Roman Catholics
Vitalists